On 10 April 1959, an Indian Canberra PR.57 reconnaissance aircraft was shot down while it was deep inside Pakistani airspace by two Pakistan Air Force (PAF) F-86F Sabres. The Canberra was on a photo reconnaissance mission over the Punjab province when it was shot down. This shootdown is also the first aerial victory for the PAF.

Background 
Aerial intrusions by Indian recon planes had been occurring in the past, with one being detected over Multan before this incident. However, they didn't intrude deeply, rather restricting themselves to such distances that they can easily return to Indian airspace without being intercepted. Because of Canberra's extreme operating altitude, Pakistani attempts to intercept them with F-86F Sabre fighters had so far failed. Moreover, Pakistani Air Defense infrastructure was being established at that time with PAF relying on World War 2 era radars like the Type-15 mobile radar for aerial scanning.

Event

On 10 April 1959, an Indian Canberra PR.57 (Serial#IP-988) reconnaissance plane of the No. 106 Squadron IAF with its pilot "Squadron Leader Jagdish Chandra Sengupta" and Navigator "Flight Lt. Satendra Nath Rampal" took off from their base in Agra on a Photo-reconnaissance mission over Pakistan's Punjab province photographing areas believed to be strategic locations between Lahore and Rawalpindi. At the time, Pakistan was busy celebrating the holy day of Eid-ul-Fitr which is why most of the senior staff of the Pakistan Air Force had been given the day off. The remaining on-duty personnel were mostly bachelors and junior officers.

At about 7:30 am, two PAF fighter pilots; squadron leader Naseer Butt (Formation leader) and Flight Lt. Muhammad Younis (wingman) from the No. 15 Squadron "Cobras" who were on Air Defense Alert were ordered to scramble from Peshawar Airbase in their North American F-86F Sabres after Sengupta's Canberra was picked up by PAF radars. The pair was vectored towards the intruding aircraft by Pilot Officer Rab Nawaz of the 223 Squadron.

Whether the Indian warplane was warned before being shot down has been disputed by India with then Indian Defense Minister V. K. Krishna Menon doubting that the Sabres ever warned the Canberra. However, in a report by the Pakistan Institute of International Affairs, the PAF did order Sengupta to surrender and make a forced landing at Gujrat which the later refused to comply with. Squadron leader Naseer then radioed Rab Nawaz for clearance to shoot down the Canberra. With most of the senior staff unavailable because of the Eid holiday, Rab Nawaz gave them their clearance as they feared the Canberra would slip away because of delays, though Nawaz did inform a senior officer who was still available that day. Naseer then executed a set of energy climbs firing his Sabre's M3 Brownings in the process in an attempt to shoot down Sengupta but failed as the Canberra was still too high. On the other side, Sengupta and Rampal themselves weren't aware of the Sabres trying to bring them down and continued with their flight in a northerly direction. Flight Lt. Yunis who had been steadily climbing while covering his leader's back came up with the idea to reveal themselves to the Canberra crew which would force them to make an easterly headed turn towards Indian territory ultimately causing the Indian warplane to lose altitude which his leader agreed with. Yunis then went into a position such that the IAF crew would be able to see him on their left side while Naseer positioned on their right. As Yunis positioned himself, the Canberra appeared to have spotted him and took a right turn after which it suddenly took a sharp turn in the opposite direction back towards Yunis likely because Sengupta panicking after spotting Naseer on the other side. The sharp turn resulted in Canberra losing a notable amount of altitude. Yunis losing no time fired his Sabre's Machine guns this time hitting the Indian Canberra's right engine which resultantly sent it into a spiral.

Aftermath

Crew's fate 
After being shot down, both of the Indian crew members managed to eject safely over West Pakistan. They were later arrested by Pakistani authorities and sent for interrogation. During their interrogation, Gupta and his navigator said that they chose 10 April as the date for the mission since they thought the Pakistanis would be busy with their Eid prayers but were surprised when they found out that the PAF was on duty. They were deported back to India the following day.

Diplomatic response 
Relations between the two countries were strained after the incident. India later maintained the position that the aircraft was on an aerial photography mission over Himachal Pradesh & Indian Administered Kashmir further claiming that a "Navigational error" led to the plane entering Pakistani airspace.

Gallantry awards 
The incident made Flight Lieutenant M. Yunis an instant hero, he became the first Pakistani to score an aerial victory against an Indian aircraft for which he was awarded the Sitara-e-Jurat.

See also 
 List of aircraft shootdowns

References 

Pakistan Air Force
1959 in international relations
1959 in military history
1959 in politics
1959 in Pakistan
20th-century aircraft shootdown incidents
Aviation accidents and incidents in Pakistan
Aviation accidents and incidents in 1959
Cold War conflicts
Combat incidents
Diplomatic incidents
Espionage scandals and incidents
Aerial reconnaissance
India–Pakistan relations